Two-time defending champion Björn Borg successfully defended his title, defeating Jimmy Connors in a repeat of the previous year's final, 6–2, 6–2, 6–3 to win the gentlemen's singles tennis title at the 1978 Wimbledon Championships.

Seeds

  Björn Borg (champion)
  Jimmy Connors (final)
  Vitas Gerulaitis (semifinals)
  Guillermo Vilas (third round)
  Brian Gottfried (quarterfinals)
  Roscoe Tanner (fourth round)
  Raúl Ramírez (quarterfinals)
  Sandy Mayer (quarterfinals)
  Ilie Năstase (quarterfinals)
  Dick Stockton (first round)
  John McEnroe (first round)
  Buster Mottram (second round)
  Wojciech Fibak (fourth round)
  John Alexander (fourth round)
  Arthur Ashe (first round)
  John Newcombe (fourth round)

Qualifying

Draw

Finals

Top half

Section 1

Section 2

Section 3

Section 4

Bottom half

Section 5

Section 6

Section 7

Section 8

References

External links

 1978 Wimbledon Championships – Men's draws and results at the International Tennis Federation

Men's Singles
Wimbledon Championship by year – Men's singles